The Coli Toro Member is a Campanian geologic member in Argentina. Dinosaur remains are among the fossils that have been recovered from the formation, although none have yet been referred to a specific genus. The sandstones of the formation were deposited in a lacustrine environment.

The formation in later publications has been reassigned as the Coli Toro Member at the basal levels of the Los Alamitos Formation, containing fossil remains of Sulcusuchus erraini. The formation partly overlies the Angostura Colorada Formation.

See also 

 List of dinosaur-bearing rock formations
 List of stratigraphic units with indeterminate dinosaur fossils

References

Bibliography

Further reading 
 R. M. Casamiquela. 1964. Sobre un dinosaurio hadrosáurido de la Argentina. Ameghiniana 3(9):285-312
 J. O'Gorman and Z. Gasparini. 2013. Revision of Sulcusuchus erraini (Sauropterygia, Polycotylidae) from the Upper Cretaceous of Patagonia, Argentina. Alcheringa 37(2):163-176

Geologic formations of Argentina
Upper Cretaceous Series of South America
Cretaceous Argentina
Campanian Stage
Sandstone formations
Lacustrine deposits
Fossiliferous stratigraphic units of South America
Paleontology in Argentina
Formations
Geology of Río Negro Province